Bee Ridge is a ridge in Knox County in the U.S. state of Missouri.

Bee Ridge was named for the honeybees in the area.

References

Landforms of Knox County, Missouri
Ridges of Missouri